Leonel Marcelo Picco (born 22 October 1998) is an Argentine professional footballer who plays as a midfielder for Colón.

Career
Picco's career started with Arsenal de Sarandí. He made the move into senior football with the club during the 2018–19 campaign, coming off the substitutes bench for his professional bow on 1 March 2019 as Arsenal drew away from home to Central Córdoba in Primera B Nacional. In July 2022, Picco joined Club Atlético Colón on a deal until the end of 2025.

Career statistics
.

References

External links

1998 births
Living people
Argentine people of Italian descent
People from Avellaneda Partido
Argentine footballers
Association football midfielders
Primera Nacional players
Arsenal de Sarandí footballers
Club Atlético Colón footballers
Sportspeople from Buenos Aires Province